Roscoe Mitchlll Jr. or Scoey Mitchlll (March 12, 1930 – March 19, 2022), usually credited as Scoey Mitchell, was an American actor, producer, writer and television director known for frequent appearances on 1970s game shows, including Match Game and Tattletales. He starred in the short-lived series Barefoot in the Park (based on the Neil Simon play) and had a recurring role on Rhoda.

He created two short-lived NBC television series, Me and Mrs. C and 13 East. He appeared as Richard Pryor's father in the film Jo Jo Dancer, Your Life Is Calling.

Early life and career
Mitchell was born on March 12, 1930, in Newburgh, New York,  as Roscoe Mitchlll Jr. (the surname had three "L"s, and no "E"). He started his career on The Smothers Brothers Comedy Hour in 1967. He appeared in What's It All About, World? as himself in 1969.

He guest-starred in television series including The Mothers-in-Law, Here Come the Brides, That Girl, The Odd Couple, The Six Million Dollar Man,  and Baretta. 

Mitchell starred in several television films, including Voyage of the Yes, Cops, and Cindy. He also turned to directing television with the film Me & Mrs. C. in 1984 and episodes of 13 East in 1989–90. Mitchlll wrote for television, including  The Scoey Mitchlll Show in 1972, Just a Little More Love in 1983, and Handsome Harry's. In addition, he ventured into production of television and television films, including Grambling's White Tiger in 1981, Gus Brown and Midnight Brewster in 1985, and Miracle at Beekman's Place in 1988. 

Mitchell also was on a number of television shows as himself, including Match Game from 1974 to 1979, Super Password in 1988, The Joey Bishop Show 1968–69, Hollywood Squares in 1968, and Tattletales from 1974 to 1978 and from 1982 to 1984. He guest starred on an episode of Taxi titled "Memories of Cab 804, Part 1" (1978) during the first season and his name was misspelled in the end credits as "Scoey Mitchlll" (a letter 'l' replaced the letter 'e').

In September 1970, ABC cast Mitchell in Barefoot in the Park based on Neil Simon's Broadway play of the same name. The series cast members were predominantly black, making it the first American television sitcom since Amos 'n' Andy to have a predominantly black cast (Vito Scotti was the sole major white character). Barefoot in the Park had been a successful 1967 film starring Robert Redford and Jane Fonda. It was thought by ABC that placing Barefoot in the Park behind Bewitched would do well, but because that show was already in a slump, Barefoot in the Park never developed high numbers for the network.  During its first few episodes, Barefoot in the Park developed behind-the-scenes strife that sealed its fate: Mitchell was fired due to "differences of opinion" with the series' producers. Rather than replace Mitchell with another actor—and already disenchanted with the low ratings—ABC decided to cancel Barefoot in the Park in December 1970.

In 1986, Mitchell was in Jo Jo Dancer, Your Life Is Calling, a semi-autobiographical film about Richard Pryor. In 2017, after a hiatus of almost thirty years, he returned to acting, in a one-off role in A Kindred Soul.

Death
Mitchell died of kidney failure on March 19, 2022, in a hospice-care facility in Torrance, California. He was survived by his wife, Claire.

Filmography

Acting

Film

Television

Directing

Television

Writing

Television

Production

Television

References

External links
 
 

1930 births
2022 deaths
20th-century African-American writers
20th-century American male actors
20th-century American screenwriters
21st-century African-American writers
21st-century American male actors
21st-century American screenwriters
African-American male actors
African-American television directors
African-American television personalities
African-American television producers
African-American television writers
American male film actors
American male television actors
American male television writers
Deaths from kidney failure
Male actors from New York (state)
Male television personalities
People from Newburgh, New York
Television personalities from New York (state)
Screenwriters from New York (state)